Howard Victor Carpendale (born 14 January 1946) is a South African-German singer living and working in Germany.

Biography 
Carpendale is a pop singer who sings most of his songs in German. His 1979 song Nachts, wenn alles schläft had been among the 50 biggest-selling singles in Germany for one year. He has released 37 regular albums (live albums and compilations not included), most of which charted in the German Album Top 10.

Carpendale has two sons, Wayne Carpendale and Cass Carpendale.

Filmography 
 1970: Musik, Musik – da wackelt die Penne
 1984: 
 1992: Wiedersehen in Kanada (TV-film)
 1994: Matchball (TV-series)
 2012: Leb' dein Leben

Awards 
 1981: Goldene Stimmgabel
 1984: Goldene Stimmgabel
 1986: Goldene Stimmgabel
 1987: Goldene Stimmgabel
 1993: Echo award in the category "Schlager/Volksmusik artist"
 1996: Echo award in the category "Schlager/Volksmusik artist"
 2004: Echo award for lifetime achievement

Cover versions 
 Living Next Door to Alice, German version
 Ti Amo, German version

External links 

 Official website

References 

Schlager musicians
1946 births
Living people
German  male singer-songwriters
South African male singer-songwriters
White South African people
South African emigrants to Germany
Naturalized citizens of Germany